Paul Anthony Pholeros  (1953 – 1 February 2016) was an Australian architect. He received his Bachelor of Science in Architecture from the University of Sydney in 1974 and a Bachelor of Architecture (Hons 1) in 1976. Pholeros established his own architectural practice, Paul Pholeros Architects, in 1984. He was also a director of Healthabitat, a non-profit organisation which aimed to improve the health of disadvantaged people by assessing and improving their housing.

Pholeros was an Adjunct Professor of Architecture at the University of Sydney. He was a Vice-Chairman and Board Member of Emergency Architects Australia. In 2007, Pholeros was made a member of the Order of Australia (AM) in recognition of his persistence and outstanding service to the health and well-being of the Indigenous population of Australia and the Torres Strait Islands.

Paul Pholeros died on 1 February 2016, aged 62.

Awards
 Member of the Order of Australia (AM), 2007
 Former Vice Chair, Emergency Architects Australia; One of the four members appointed by the Prime Minister of Australia to the National Policy Commission on Remote Indigenous Housing 2007–2009
 Royal Australian Institute of Architects President's Award, 1994
 Royal Australian Institute of Architects Leadership in Sustainability Prize, (Healthabitat) 2011
 World Habitat Award – from the United Nations' Habitat and Building and Social Housing Foundation, (Healthabitat) 2011
 Rockefeller Foundation, Practitioners Residency Award Bellagio, Lake Como Italy 2011

References

1953 births
2016 deaths
Architects from Sydney
University of Sydney alumni
Academic staff of the University of Sydney
Members of the Order of Australia
Australian people of Greek descent